Pura sangre may refer to:

Pura sangre (film), a 1982 Colombian horror film
Pura sangre (Venezuelan TV series), a 1994 telenovela
Pura sangre (Colombian TV series), a 2007 telenovela

See also
De pura sangre, a 1985 Mexican telenovela